Bobby Steggert (born March 2, 1981) is an American therapist and former actor of theatre, television and film.

Early life and education
He was born in Frederick, Maryland.  Steggart attended Frederick High School, and graduated in 1999 as valedictorian of his class.

Steggert graduated from New York University's Tisch School of the Arts in New York City, and studied a yearlong foundation course at the Royal Academy of Dramatic Art in London, England.

Career
Steggert joined the cast of the television soap opera All My Children, appearing as Sam Grey from March 2005 until his final appearance on December 20, 2005.

After appearing in, among other Broadway and Off-Broadway productions, "Master Harold"...and the Boys,  A Christmas Carol, The New Group's The Music Teacher and columbinus at the New York Theatre Workshop,  Steggert starred as Jimmy Curry in the 2007 Broadway revival of the musical 110 in the Shade, a role which garnered him an Outer Critics Circle Award nomination.

Steggert then appeared at the Vineyard Theatre in Manhattan as the male lead in the 2008 musical The Slug Bearers of Kayrol Island (Or, the Friends of Dr. Rushower), with libretto and drawings by Ben Katchor, music by Mark Mulcahy and directed by Bob McGrath.  For his role, he was nominated for both the Drama Desk Award for Outstanding Featured Actor in a Musical and the Drama League Award for Distinguished Performance.

He has appeared in numerous roles around the country.  Highlights include the Dauphin in George Bernard Shaw's Saint Joan and Juliet in Shakespeare's Romeo and Juliet at The Repertory Theater of St. Louis, The Cripple of Inishmaan at the Milwaukee Repertory Theater, and "Master Harold"...and the Boys and Speech and Debate at L.A. Theatre Works.

His film credits include For Richer or Poorer (1997), directed by Bryan Spicer; Kinsey (2004), directed by Bill Condon; Game 6 (2005), directed by Michael Hoffman; and The Namesake (2006), directed by Mira Nair.

He appeared in a production of Ragtime at the John F. Kennedy Center for the Performing Arts in Washington, D.C., in April 2009.  He later starred in the short-lived Broadway revival of the Kennedy Center's production of Ragtime in the role of Mother's Younger Brother.

He then starred in the Off-Broadway production of Yank: A WWII Love Story at the York Theatre Company in the spring of 2010.

He starred in A. R. Gurney's The Grand Manner at Lincoln Center Theater in the summer of 2010, opposite Kate Burton, Boyd Gaines and Brenda Wehle.

Steggert starred as Will Bloom in the musical version of Big Fish alongside Norbert Leo Butz and Kate Baldwin. It ran for 98 performances from September 5 through December 29, 2013. Ben Brantley's New York Times review (October 6, 2013) said, "Mr. Steggert's singing exudes a radiant sincerity that transcends corn."

He co-starred (as Will Ogden) with Tyne Daly in the premiere of Terrence McNally's Mothers and Sons at the Bucks County Playhouse in New Hope, Pennsylvania. It had a limited run of 14 performances from June 13 to June 23, 2013. The cast was interviewed by Theatre Sensation's Kelli Curtin: "Bobby Steggert plays the character of Will in this play. Steggert describes his character as, "a modern gay man where being a husband to a man and having children is a viable option. My character represents the progress that has been made in society. My character is strong willed, steadfast in point of view and I admire that about him." According to Steggert, this play is important because it is about relationships and families. He states, "Twenty years ago a play like this would be classified as a 'gay drama.' Now a play that addresses issues faced by gay people is mainstream. The characters in this play are interesting because they are people and not because of their sexuality." Steggert is hopeful that people that see this play will "broaden their definition of family after seeing Mothers and Sons through observing the family on stage." 
 Mothers and Sons ran on Broadway at the John Golden Theatre from February 23, 2014 to June 22, 2014, with Steggert and Daly, joined by Fred Weller, and original director Sheryl Kaller.

In March 2016 Steggert starred Off-Broadway in the title role of Adam, in Anna Zeigler’s Boy at the Clurman Theatre.

Around 2016, Steggert "completely turned my back on an acting career that I had spent twenty years building." He earned a Master’s in Social Work from Columbia University and trained as a therapist at the Institute of Contemporary Psychotherapy in their Gender and Sexuality Program. In an announcement of his retirement from acting, he stated, "if I ever return to acting, it will be with this knowledge (and I hope it reminds you of your own possibilities) — that the work does not stop when unemployed — that you are an artist every day, if you so choose — that art is an obligation, and that it must be lived, not simply offered to those who have paid the price of admission."

Awards and nominations
For his role in Ragtime, Steggert was nominated for a 2010 Tony Award, Drama Desk Award, Outer Critics Circle Award, and a Drama League Award.

For his role in Yank!, he received nominations for the Drama Desk Award (2010) and New York Innovative Theatre Awards (2008).

Prior to Ragtime, Steggert was nominated for an Outer Critics Circle Award in 2007 for his portrayal of Jimmy Curry in the Broadway revival of 110 in the Shade, and 2008  Drama League Award and Drama Desk Award nominations for his starring role in The Slug Bearers of Kayrol Island.

Discography
 What I Wanna Be When I Grow Up by Scott Alan, sings the song Over The Mountains (2010)
 Big Fish: Original Broadway Cast Recording as Will Bloom.  Music and lyrics by Andrew Lippa (2014)
 Ahrens and Flaherty: Nice Fighting You - A 30th Anniversary Celebration Live at 54 BELOW (2014), performing Larger Than Life from My Favorite Year, The Night That Goldman Spoke at Union Square from Ragtime and, with Annaleigh Ashford, Close, but No Cigar from an unproduced musical version of Bedazzled.
 Yank!: Original Cast Recording as Stu

Personal life
In September 2013, Out magazine reported that Steggert is gay.

See also

 List of NYU Tisch School of the Arts people
 List of people from Maryland
 List of people from New York City
 List of Royal Academy of Dramatic Art alumni
 List of soap opera actors

References

External links
 
 
 
 Bobby Steggert profile
 Bobby Steggert at Broadway.com

1981 births
20th-century American male actors
20th-century American singers
21st-century American male actors
21st-century American singers
Alumni of RADA
American expatriates in England
American male film actors
American male musical theatre actors
American male soap opera actors
American gay actors
American gay musicians
American LGBT singers
Living people
Male actors from Maryland
Male actors from New York City
Singers from Maryland
People from Frederick, Maryland
Singers from New York City
Tisch School of the Arts alumni
20th-century American LGBT people
21st-century American LGBT people